was a Japanese businessman and the third president of Nintendo, joining the company in 1949 until stepping down on 24 May 2002, being subsequently succeeded by Satoru Iwata. During his 53-year tenure, Yamauchi transformed Nintendo from a hanafuda card-making company that had been active solely in Japan into a multibillion-dollar video game publisher and global conglomerate. He was the great-grandson of Fusajiro Yamauchi, Nintendo's first president and founder.

In April 2013, Forbes estimated Yamauchi's net worth at $2.1 billion; he was the 13th richest person in Japan and the 491st richest in the world. In 2008, Yamauchi was Japan's wealthiest person with a fortune at that time estimated at $7.8 billion.
At the time of his death, Yamauchi was the largest shareholder at Nintendo.

Early life 
Yamauchi was born in Kyoto to father Shikanojo Inaba and mother Kimi. His father abandoned them both when he was five years old, and his mother was unable to cope as a single parent so she gave him up to her parents. With his grandfather being a business owner, this adoption aligned his future inheritance of what would become Nintendo. He was sent to a preparatory school in Kyoto at age twelve. He planned to study law or engineering, but World War II disrupted his studies. Since he was too young to fight, he was put to work in a military factory. Once the war ended in 1945, Yamauchi went to Waseda University to study law. He married Michiko Inaba. With the absence of Yamauchi's father, his grandparents met to arrange the marriage.

Nintendo career

Early career 
In 1948, Yamauchi's grandfather and president of Nintendo, Sekiryo Kaneda, suffered a stroke. As he had no other immediate successor, he asked Yamauchi to come immediately to Nintendo to assume the job of president. He had to leave his law degree at Waseda University to do so. Yamauchi would only accept the position if he were the only family member working at Nintendo. Reluctantly, Yamauchi's grandfather agreed, and died shortly thereafter in 1949. Under the agreement, his older cousin had to be fired. Due to his young age and total lack of management experience, most employees did not take Yamauchi seriously and resented him. Soon after taking over, he had to deal with a strike by factory employees who expected him to cave in easily. Instead, he asserted his authority by firing many long-time employees who questioned his authority. He had the company name changed to Nintendo Karuta and established its new headquarters in Kyoto. Yamauchi led Nintendo in a "notoriously imperialistic style". He was the sole judge of potential new products, and only a product that appealed to him and his instincts went on the market.

He was the first to introduce the plastic Western playing card into the Japanese market. Western playing cards were still a novelty in Japan and the public associated them with Western-styled gambling games such as poker and bridge. Most gambling activities were technically illegal by default with only the few legally sanctioned exceptions of horse racing, pachinko, and lottery. Therefore, the market for anything which was associated with gambling, including hanafuda, was limited. Yamauchi's first "hit" came when he made a licensing agreement with Walt Disney in 1959 for his plastic playing cards. Nintendo targeted its playing cards as a tool for party games that the whole family could enjoy, a foreshadowing of the company's approach going into the 21st century. Disney's tie-in was made towards that end. Nintendo's Disney playing card was also accompanied by a small, thin booklet with many tutorials for different card games. The strategy succeeded and the product sold an unprecedented 600,000 units in one year, soon gracing Nintendo with the domination of the Japanese playing card market. With this success, Yamauchi once again changed the company name to Nintendo Company Limited and took the company public and became the chairman. He then decided to travel to the U.S. to visit the United States Playing Card Company, the world's biggest manufacturer of playing cards. Upon arriving in Cincinnati, Yamauchi was disappointed to see a small-scale office and factory. This led to the realization that card manufacturing was an extremely limited venture.

Upon his return to Japan, Yamauchi decided to diversify the company. Some of the new areas he ventured into included a taxi company called Daiya, a love hotel with rooms rented by the hour (which he reportedly frequented), and individually portioned instant rice. All of these ventures eventually failed and brought the company into the brink of bankruptcy. However, one day, Yamauchi spotted a factory engineer named Gunpei Yokoi playing with a simple extendable claw, something Yokoi made to amuse himself during his break. Yamauchi ordered Yokoi to develop the extendable claw into a proper product. The product was named the Ultra Hand and was an instant hit. It was then that Yamauchi decided to move Nintendo's focus into toy making. With an already established distribution system into department stores for its playing cards, the transition was a natural one for Nintendo. Yamauchi created a new department called Games and Setup, manned initially by only Yokoi and another employee who looked after the finances and was situated in a warehouse in Kyoto for the purpose of research and development. Gunpei Yokoi was solely assigned to develop new products. Yokoi utilized his degree in engineering by developing what is now known as electric toys such as the Love Tester and a light gun using solar cells for targets. These electric toys were quite a novelty in the 1960s when most other toys were simple in origin, such as toy blocks or dolls. Eventually, Nintendo succeeded in establishing itself as a major player in the toy market.

Beginning of the electronics era 
Yamauchi realized that technological breakthroughs in the electronic industry meant that electronics could be incorporated into entertainment products since the prices were decreasing. Atari and Magnavox were already selling gaming devices for use with television sets. Yamauchi negotiated a license with Magnavox to sell its game console, the Magnavox Odyssey. After hiring several Sharp Electronics employees, Nintendo launched the Color TV-Game 6 in Japan, which was followed by several revisions and updates of this series.

Yamauchi had Nintendo expand into the United States to take advantage of the growing American arcade market. He hired his son-in-law Minoru Arakawa to head the new American operation. Their Japanese hits such as Radar Scope, Space Fever, and Sheriff did not achieve the same success in the United States, so Yamauchi turned to designer Shigeru Miyamoto's pet project, Donkey Kong in 1981, which became a smash hit.

Yamauchi infused Nintendo with a unique industrial development process. He instituted three separate research and development units, which competed with one another and aimed for innovation. This system fostered a high degree of both unusual and successful gadgets. Yokoi, who headed R&D1, created the first portable LCD video game featuring a microprocessor called the Game & Watch. Although the Game & Watch was successful, Yamauchi wanted something that was cheap enough that most could buy it yet unique enough so that it would dominate the market for as long as possible.

Nintendo Entertainment System 

Yamauchi was so confident with the Famicom that he promised an electronics company one million unit orders within two years. The Famicom easily reached that goal. After selling several million units, Yamauchi realized the importance of the software that ran on the game systems and made sure the system was easy to program. Yamauchi believed that technicians did not create excellent games, but artists did. The Famicom was released in the United States as the Nintendo Entertainment System (NES). Yamauchi, with no engineering or video game background, was the only one deciding which games were to be released. His remarkable intuition for what people would want in the future may have been one of the reasons for Nintendo's success. To help spring creativity, he created three research and development groups and allowed them to compete against each other. This caused the designers to work harder to try to get their games approved.

Super Nintendo Entertainment System 

In 1990, the Super Famicom was released in Japan. It was released a year later in North America and in 1992 in Europe, in both regions as the Super Nintendo Entertainment System (SNES). The Super Famicom was sold out within three days in Japan and had gamers camping for days outside shops in hope of getting the next shipment. Nintendo showed major expansion during this period with new plants, R&D facilities and a partnership with Rare. Yamauchi had displayed from the beginning a knack at identifying good games even though he had never played them, and he continued to do so alone until at least 1994. A 1995 article in Next Generation reported that Yamauchi, though 68 years old, "remains very much in charge" of Nintendo and called him "The most feared and respected man in the videogame industry".

In 1995, the Virtual Boy was released but did not sell well. Nevertheless, Yamauchi said at a press conference that he still had faith in it and that the company would continue developing games for it. In the fiscal year ending 31 March 1995, Nintendo achieved revenues of 416 billion yen.

Nintendo 64 

In 1996, Nintendo released its new, fully 3D capable console, the Nintendo 64. Around this time Yamauchi publicly stated that he wanted to retire but did not think there were any good candidates to succeed him yet. A year later, he announced that he would retire by 2000, regardless of the lack of a good successor, and in particular wanted to end his career with the launch of the 64DD. In 1999, Yamauchi and Nintendo announced their intentions to work on a new system with an IBM Gekko processor and Matsushita DVD technology codenamed Dolphin. This system was named GameCube. Yamauchi talked at E3 about the impact that the release of Xbox would have on the GameCube.

GameCube 

Yamauchi touted the GameCube as a machine designed exclusively to be a video game console, opting not to include media playback. This emphasis towards "performance only" and the creation of hardware that would allow developers to "easily create games" is what Yamauchi believed would set the GameCube apart from its competitors.

Yamauchi also wanted the machine to be the least expensive of its kind, in his belief that people "do not play with the game machine itself. They play with the software, and they are forced to purchase a game machine in order to use the software. Therefore the price of the machine should be as cheap as possible." Nintendo hence priced the GameCube significantly less expensively than its rivals in the market, although the console's games were priced identically to those designed for the competing systems.

Post-Nintendo presidency 
On 24 May 2002, Yamauchi stepped down as president of Nintendo and was succeeded by the head of Nintendo's Corporate Planning Division, Satoru Iwata. Yamauchi subsequently became the chairman of Nintendo's board of directors. He left the board on 29 June 2005, due to his age, and because he believed that he was leaving the company in good hands. Yamauchi also refused to accept his retirement pension, which was reported to be around $9 to $14 million, believing that Nintendo could put it to better use. He remained Nintendo's largest shareholder, and as of 2008 retained a 10% share in Nintendo. He was the 12th richest man in Japan due to his shares in Nintendo since its success with the Wii and Nintendo DS consoles. He donated the majority of the 7.5 billion yen to build a new cancer treatment center in Kyoto. In 2006, he founded Shigureden, a museum of poetry in Kyoto.

Personal life
In 1950, Yamauchi's wife Michiko gave birth to their first child, a daughter named Yōko. During the next few years, Michiko had several miscarriages and was often ill. In 1957, she gave birth to another daughter, Fujiko and, shortly after, a son named Katsuhito.

Michiko Inaba died on 29 July 2012, aged 82.

When Yamauchi's father, Shikanojō, returned years later to see his son, Yamauchi refused to speak to him. When Yamauchi was close to 30, his half-sister contacted him and informed him that Shikanojō had died of a stroke. At the funeral, he met his father's wife and their four daughters whom he never knew existed. He began feeling sorry that he had not taken the opportunity to reconcile with his father when he was still alive. The death of his father changed Yamauchi, and he grieved for months and cried freely. From then on he made regular visits to his father's grave.

Yamauchi has been described as a stern man with a single-minded focus on his business. He did not play video games; his sole serious hobby was the strategy board game Go, though Masayuki Uemura, the primary engineer of the original NES, has stated that he also enjoyed hanafuda and would play cards with Nintendo employees at parties. He was ranked a seventh Dan at Go, roughly equivalent to chessmaster.

Ownership of the Seattle Mariners 
In the early 1990s, the professional baseball team the Seattle Mariners were available for sale and United States Senator Slade Gorton asked Nintendo of America to find a Japanese investor who would keep the club in Seattle. Yamauchi offered to buy the franchise, even though he had never been to a baseball game. Although the owner accepted the offer, the MLB commissioner Fay Vincent and ownership committee were strongly opposed to the idea of a non-North American owner and did not approve the deal. However, following the strong support and sentiments of the people of Seattle and press the commissioner formally approved the deal, under the condition that Yamauchi had less than 50% of the vote. This was a major development in American baseball, because this opened the gates for Japanese baseball players to American league teams, which had been previously denied. In 2000, the club made its first profit of $2.6 million since its acquisition by Yamauchi. Yamauchi never attended a Mariners game.

Death
On 19 September 2013, aged 85, Yamauchi died at a hospital following complications of pneumonia. Nintendo released a statement stating that its staff members were mourning the loss of their former president.

References

External links

 IGN's report on Yamauchi's leaving of the board of directors
 N-Sider.com's article on The Mind Behind the Empire
 IGN's summary of the Hiroshi Yamauchi interview at Nikkei Business Daily
  (Waybacked)
 The World's Billionaires: #149 Hiroshi Yamauchi Forbes
 Yamauchi No.10 Family Office official website of Yamauchi's family office

                   

20th-century Japanese businesspeople
21st-century Japanese businesspeople
1927 births
2013 deaths
Deaths from pneumonia in Japan
Japanese billionaires
Japanese philanthropists
Japanese video game businesspeople
Major League Baseball owners
Nintendo people
People from Kyoto
Seattle Mariners owners
Waseda University alumni
20th-century philanthropists